Cleander or Kleandros may refer to:

Marcus Aurelius Cleander  (fl. 2nd century), Roman freedman from Phrygia, favourite and praetorian prefect of Emperor Commodus
Cleander of Gela (fl. 5th century BC), tyrant
Cleander of Sparta (fl. 5th to 4th century BC), harmost
Cleander of Macedon (fl. 4th century), general
Cleander of Aegina (fl. 5th century BC), son of Telesarchus pankratiast, winner in Isthmia
Cleander of Phigalea (fl.5th-6th century BC) soothsayer from Phigalea who urged the population of Tyrins to war against the Argives